Rev. Thomas Flynn SSC, was an Irish missionary priest, who was killed by Hukbalahap communist rebels in 1950 in the Philippines.

Biography
Thomas Flynn was born on 5 November 1908 in Sixmilebridge, County Clare, Ireland.

In 1928 Flynn went to Clonliffe College, Dublin to be educated for priesthood, moving  in 1931 to  St. Patrick's College, Maynooth. He  was ordained a priest for the Dublin diocese in 1935. From 1941, he served as chaplain to the Gurkhas in the British Army. He joined the Missionary Society of St. Columban Mission to China in 1947, and was posted to the Philippines in 1948.

Death
On 30 October 1950, Flynn was taken from his parish in Labrador, Pangasinan, Philippines by Hukbalahap Communist guerrillas, and killed. He was 42 years old. In 2003 his remains were exhumed and interred in the family plot in Ballysheen, Co. Clare, In attendance at his interment were 30 Columban fathers and his sister, Sr Marie Flynn of the Medical Missionaries of Mary.

See also
Catholic Church in the Philippines

References

1908 births
1950 deaths
Alumni of Clonliffe College
Alumni of St Patrick's College, Maynooth
Irish Roman Catholic missionaries
20th-century Irish Roman Catholic priests
Kidnappings in the Philippines
Missionary Society of St. Columban
People educated at St Flannan's College
People from County Clare
People murdered in the Philippines